The following is a list of United States senators and representatives who died while they were serving their terms after 2000.

2000s

2010s

2020s

See also 
 List of United States Congress members who died in office (1790–1899)
 List of United States Congress members who died in office (1900–1949)
 List of United States Congress members who died in office (1950–1999)
 List of United States Congress members killed or wounded in office

References

External links 
 Memorial Services for members of the U.S. Congress who died in the 1910s
 Memorial Services for members of the U.S. Congress who died in the 1920s
 Memorial Services for members of the U.S. Congress who died in the 1930s
 Memorial Services for members of the U.S. Congress who died in the 1940s
 Memorial Services for members of the U.S. Congress who died in the 1950s
 Memorial Services for members of the U.S. Congress who died in the 1960s
 Memorial Services for members of the U.S. Congress who died in the 1970s
 Memorial Services for members of the U.S. Congress who died in the 1980s
 Memorial Services for members of the U.S. Congress who died in the 1990s
 Memorial Services for members of the U.S. Congress who died in the 2000s
 Addresses for members of the U.S. Congress who died in the 1860s
 Addresses for members of the U.S. Congress who died in the 1870s
 Memorial Addresses for members of the U.S. Congress who died in the 1880s
 Memorial Addresses for members of the U.S. Congress who died in the 1890s

2000